Glenn MacDonald (born August 27, 1952) is a Canadian-born American economist. He is the John M. Olin Distinguished Professor of Economics and Strategy at the Olin Business School at Washington University in St. Louis, and a professor of economics in the department of economics in the school's College of Arts and Sciences.  He also serves as the director of the Center for Research in Economics and Strategy at Olin.

Early life
MacDonald was born on August 27, 1952, in Halifax, Nova Scotia, Canada. He enrolled at York University in Toronto, Ontario, for his Honors Bachelor of Arts and Science degree in economics and mathematics "because it was something to do." He graduated Summa Cum Laude in 1975 and enrolled at the University of Rochester for his Master's degree and PhD in economics.

Career
MacDonald returned to Canada as lecturer at the University of Western Ontario in 1978. After completing his PhD in 1979, he became an Assistant Professor, receiving tenure and Promotion to Associate Professor in 1982, snd promotion to Full Professor in 1984. He joined the University of Rochester's Simon School of Business in 1992. In 2001, MacDonald joined Washington University in St. Louis as the John M. Olin Distinguished Professor of Economics and Strategy and Director of the Center for Research in Economics and Strategy.

Selected publications 
 

 

 

 

 

 

 

 

 

 

 
  MacDonald, Glenn; Ryall, Michael D. (JAnuary 2018). "Do new entrants sustain, destroy, or create guaranteed profitability?". Strategic Managment Journal. 39 (6): 1630-1649.  https://doi.org/10.1002/smj.2770

References

External links
 Faculty webpage
 

Living people
1952 births
20th-century Canadian economists
21st-century Canadian economists
21st-century American economists
University of Rochester alumni
Washington University in St. Louis faculty
York University alumni
Academic staff of the University of Western Ontario